Yonakor is a surname.  Notable people with the surname include:

John Yonakor (1921–2001), American football player
Rich Yonakor (1958–2022), American basketball player, son of John